The Scott Bar salamander (Plethodon asupak) is a species of salamander in the family Plethodontidae, endemic to the United States, where it is restricted to a very small range in the Scott River drainage in Siskiyou County, California, at altitudes between  above sea level. Described in 2005, it is one of the most recently described species in the large genus Plethodon.

Description
It has a broad brown or bronze dorsal stripe and is otherwise purplish-gray with white flecks that condense on the sides and limbs into larger patches. The underparts are dark gray or purplish mottled with paler gray and flecked with white. It frequently has gold spotting on its otherwise black irises. Juveniles have paired, reddish dorsal stripes.

Distribution and habitat
A species endemic to California, it inhabits shaded, moss-covered talus slopes in old-growth mixed evergreen and montane fir forests of the Klamath Mountain Range. It was discovered in 2001, and is currently known from a few locations near the confluence of the Klamath and Scott Rivers, hence its common name Scott Bar salamander. Its range is only 20 km (13 mi) at its greatest dimension.

Status
With a very restricted range and a habitat requirement for old-growth forest, this salamander is threatened by logging which is allowed, under certain circumstances, inside the national forest it inhabits. The International Union for Conservation of Nature  has assessed it as being an endangered species.

References 

Plethodon
Amphibians described in 2005
Amphibians of the United States
Endemic fauna of California
Taxonomy articles created by Polbot